State Highway 72 (SH 72) is a  state highway passing through the foothills and the eastern edge of the Front Range. Its southern terminus is at Interstate 70 (I-70) in Wheat Ridge, and its northern terminus is at SH 7 east of Allenspark.

Route description

The route is a mainly rural, scenic, mountainous highway; not having many junctions. It begins at I-70 (Exit 266) in Wheat Ridge as Ward Road. It continues north through the western parts of Arvada where it becomes Coal Creek Canyon Rd. The highway continues west-north-west through Coal Creek Canyon and aptly named Wondervu, across the Union Pacific Railroad tracks at Pinecliffe, eventually joining the Peak to Peak Scenic Byway northbound.  For three miles along the Byway it coincides with SH 119.  The two routes diverge at Nederland. From Nederland, SH 72 continues north along the Byway past Ward to its terminus with SH 7 east of Allenspark.

History
The route was established in the 1920s, when it began at 46th Avenue in Denver and headed northwest to Nederland. The section of the present-day SH 72 north of Nederland was designated as SH 160. By 1936, the southeastern terminus had been moved to SH 58, itself since relocated. The section from SH 93 east was paved by 1946, and the route was paved entirely by 1958. In 1968, SH 160 was deleted and SH 72 took the route from Nederland to Raymond.

Major intersections

References

External links

  Colorado Department of Transportation (CDOT): Colorado Scenic Byways - Peak To Peak Highway

072
Transportation in Jefferson County, Colorado
Transportation in Boulder County, Colorado
Transportation in Gilpin County, Colorado
Wheat Ridge, Colorado
Arvada, Colorado